The 1978 Miami Redskins football team was an American football team that represented Miami University in the Mid-American Conference (MAC) during the 1978 NCAA Division I-A football season. In its first season under head coach Tom Reed, the team compiled an 8–2–1 record (5–2 against MAC opponents), finished in third place in the MAC, and outscored all opponents by a combined total of 228 to 161.

The team's statistical leaders included Larry Fortner with 976 passing yards, Mark Hunter with 1,046 rushing yards, and Paul Warth with 299 receiving yards.

Schedule

References

Miami
Miami RedHawks football seasons
Miami Redskins football